Kırıkkale is a village under the de facto control of Northern Cyprus, about  east of Athienou. It is one of four villages in the claimed district under the de facto control of Northern Cyprus, the other three being Arsos, Pergamos and Tremetousia.

References

Communities in Larnaca District
Populated places in Lefkoşa District